Matt Molloy (born 12 January 1947) is an Irish musician, from a region known for producing talented flautists.  As a child, he began playing the flute and won the All-Ireland Flute Championship at nineteen. Considered one of the most brilliant Irish musicians, his style that adapts piping techniques to the flute has influenced many contemporary Irish flute players.

During the 1970s, Molloy was a member of The Bothy Band and its successor, the re-founded Planxty.  He joined The Chieftains in 1979, replacing Michael Tubridy.  Over the course of his career, Molloy has worked with the Irish Chamber Orchestra, Paul Brady, Tommy Peoples, Micheál Ó Súilleabháin and Dónal Lunny.  Molloy owns a pub on Bridge Street in Westport, County Mayo where there are regular Irish music sessions.

Discography
Solo Albums
Matt Molloy with Donal Lunny (1976)
Molloy, Brady, Peoples (1978)
Contentment Is Wealth (1985)
Heathery Breeze (1985)
Stony Steps (1987)
The Fire Aflame (1992)
Music at Matt Molloy's (1993)
Shadows on Stone (1996)
The West Ocean String Quartet (with Matt Molloy):The Guiding Moon (2007)
 Pathway to the Well (2007) Matt Molloy, John Carty, Arty McGlynn
 Back to the Island (2019)

Contributing artist
H-Block (Compilation by Christy Moore) (1978 album)
The Rough Guide to Irish Music (1996)

References

External links

Matt Molloy's web site
An interview with Matt Molloy

1947 births
20th-century Irish people
21st-century Irish people
Irish flautists
Living people
Musicians from County Mayo
Musicians from County Roscommon
People from County Roscommon
The Chieftains members
The Bothy Band members
Planxty members
Claddagh Records artists
Green Linnet Records artists